Virgen María de África BC is a Equatoguinean basketball club. The club's colors are orange and white.

In 2019, the team competed in the  inaugural qualifiers for the Basketball Africa League. In Group C, Virgen ended with a 0–3 record while Francisco Mba Nzang led the team in scoring.

In African competitions
BAL Qualifiers (1 appearance)
2020 – First Round

Notable players
 Frank Mba

References

External links
Official Facebook page

Basketball teams in Equatorial Guinea
Road to BAL teams